Carl Taulauniu Seumanutafa (born June 15, 1983) is a Samoan professional mixed martial artist who competes in the Heavyweight division. A professional since 2007, he has competed for Bellator, Strikeforce, ShoXC, EliteXC, Tachi Palace Fights, King of the Cage, M-1 Global, and the PFL.

Background
Born and raised in Samoa, Seumanutafa moved with his family to San Francisco at the age of 12, living in Bayview-Hunters Point. He attended J. Eugene McAteer High School where he competed in wrestling.

Mixed martial arts career

Early career
Seumanutafa made his professional debut in March of 2007, winning his first three bouts all via TKO before being signed by EliteXC.

EliteXC and Strikeforce
Seumanutafa made his promotional debut at EliteXC: Unfinished Business on July 26, 2008 against Mike Cook. Seumanutafa won via first-round knockout with a slam.

He returned two months later for the Elite Challenger series, facing Shane del Rosario. Seumanutafa was handed his first loss via TKO in the second round. In February 2009, Seumanutafa fought at M-1 Challenge 12: USA against Edson Franca. Seumanutafa lost via split decision after two rounds.

After the closing EliteXC and its absorption by Strikeforce, Semanutafa returned to the promotion three months later at the inaugural Strikeforce: Challengers event on May 15, 2009. Seumanutafa faced Lavar Johnson. During a takedown attempt, Seumanutafa was knocked out with an uppercut just 18 seconds into the first round.

Independent promotions
Seumanutafa snapped his three-fight losing streak with three straight TKO wins from 2010 to 2012. In October of 2012, Seumanutafa faced Dave Huckaba and was knocked out in the first round.

He then fought Javy Ayala February of 2013, winning via first-round TKO.

Bellator MMA
Semanutafa made his Bellator debut at Bellator 148 against Javy Ayala on January 29, 2016. Seumanutafa won again via ground and pound TKO, this time in the second round. Seumanutafa then faced Matt Mitrione at Bellator 157. Despite scoring an early knockdown, he was defeated via KO at 3:22 of the first round.

Seumanutafa returned to the Bellator cage in 2017 at Bellator 181, losing a unanimous decision to Valentin Moldavsky.

Professional Fighters League
After his loss to Moldavsky, Seumanutafa went 2-1 in independent promotions before signing with the Professional Fighters League.

Seumanutafa made his promotional debut on the preliminary card of PFL 3, facing Croatian Ante Delija. Seumanutafa was defeated via unanimous decision. 

Seumanutafa then faced Ali Isaev at PFL 6 on August 8, 2019. He lost again via unanimous decision.

Seumanutafa, as a replacement for Stuart Austin, faced Renan Ferreira on June 25, 2021 at PFL 6.  He lost the bout via unanimous decision.

Seumanutafa faced Muhammed DeReese on August 19, 2021 at PFL 8. He lost the bout via unanimous decision.

Personal life
Ayala is married and has two children; an eight-year old son named Tamatoa and seven-year old daughter; Eliza-Andra. Aside from fighting, Seumanutafa has worked as a personal trainer and is an assistant coach to NFL offseason player development for the Seattle Seahawks, Denver Broncos, Oakland Raiders, and his own favorite NFL team, the San Francisco 49ers.

Mixed martial arts record

|-
|Loss
|align=center|12–14
|Muhammed DeReese	
|Decision (unanimous)
|PFL 8 
|
|align=center|3
|align=center|5:00
|Hollywood, Florida, United States
|
|-
|Loss
|align=center|12–13
|Renan Ferreira
|Decision (unanimous)
|PFL 6
|
|align=center|3
|align=center|5:00
|Atlantic City, New Jersey, United States
|
|-
|Loss
|align=center|12–12
|Dustin Joynson
|Decision (unanimous)
|Cage Fury Fighting Championships 87
|
|align=center|3
|align=center|5:00
|Philadelphia, Pennsylvania, United States
|
|-
|Loss
|align=center|12–11
|Ali Isaev
|Decision (unanimous)
|PFL 6
|
|align=center|3
|align=center|5:00
|Atlantic City, New Jersey, United States
|
|-
|Loss
|align=center|12–10
|Ante Delija
|Decision (unanimous)
|PFL 3
|
|align=center|3
|align=center|5:00
|Long Island, New York, United States
|
|-
| Win
| align=center| 12–9
| Nick Rossborough
| TKO (injury)
| Fierce FC: Fitcon Fights
| 
| align=center|2
| align=center| 0:47
| Salt Lake City, Utah, United States
|
|-
| Loss
| align=center| 11–9
| Shelton Graves
| Decision (unanimous)
| Final Fight Championship 32
| 
| align=center| 5
| align=center| 5:00
| Las Vegas, Nevada, United States
|
|-
| Win
| align=center| 11–8
| Bill Widler
| TKO (punches)
| KOTC: No Escape
| 
| align=center| 1
| align=center| 2:05
| Oroville, California, United States
| 
|-
| Loss
| align=center| 10–8
| Valentin Moldavsky
| Decision (unanimous)
| Bellator 181
| 
| align=center| 3
| align=center| 5:00
| Thackerville, Oklahoma, United States
| 
|-
| Loss
| align=center| 10–7
| Matt Mitrione
| KO (punch)
| Bellator 157
| 
| align=center| 1
| align=center| 3:22
| St. Louis, Missouri, United States
| 
|-
| Win
| align=center| 10–6
| Javy Ayala
| TKO (punches)
| Bellator 148
| 
| align=center| 2
| align=center| 3:46
| Fresno, California, United States
| 
|-
| Loss
| align=center| 9–6
| DJ Linderman
| Decision (unanimous)
| KOTC: Total Elimination 
| 
| align=center| 3
| align=center| 5:00
| Oroville, California, United States
| 
|-
| Win
| align=center| 9–5
| Josh Appelt
| Decision (unanimous)
| West Coast FC 12
| 
| align=center| 3
| align=center| 5:00
| Sacramento, California, United States
| 
|-
| Loss
| align=center| 8–5
| Jack May
| TKO (head kick and punches)
| TPF 18: Martinez vs. Culley
| 
| align=center| 1
| align=center| 2:57
| Lemoore, California, United States
| 
|-
| Win
| align=center| 8–4
| Javy Ayala
| TKO (punches)
| Dragon House 13
| 
| align=center| 1
| align=center| 3:00
| Oakland, California, United States
| 
|-
| Loss
| align=center| 7–4
| Dave Huckaba
| KO (punch)
| Cage Combat Fighting Championships
| 
| align=center| 1
| align=center| 4:35
| Santa Rosa, California, United States
| 
|-
| Win
| align=center| 7–3
| Ruben Villareal
| TKO (elbows)
| Gladiator Challenge: World Class
| 
| align=center| 3
| align=center| 2:57
| Lincoln, California, United States
| 
|-
| Win
| align=center| 6–3
| CJ Leveque
| TKO (punches)
| Impact MMA 1: Recognition 
| 
| align=center| 1
| align=center| 2:20
| Pleasanton, California, United States
| 
|-
| Win
| align=center| 5–3
| Derrick Williams
| TKO (punches)
| Global Knockout: Fall Brawl
| 
| align=center| 3
| align=center| 1:05
| Jackson, California, United States
| 
|-
| Loss
| align=center| 4–3
| Lavar Johnson
| KO (punch)
| Strikforce Challengers: Evangelista vs. Aina
| 
| align=center| 1
| align=center| 0:18
| Fresno, California, United States
| 
|-
| Loss
| align=center| 4–2
| Edson Franca
| Decision (split)
| M-1 Challenge 12: USA
| 
| align=center| 2
| align=center| 5:00
| Tacoma, Washington, United States
| 
|-
| Loss
| align=center| 4–1
| Shane del Rosario
| TKO (punches)
| ShoXC: Elite Challenger Series
| 
| align=center| 2
| align=center| 1:07
| Santa Ynez, California, United States
| 
|-
| Win
| align=center| 4–0
| Mike Cook
| KO (slam)
| EliteXC: Unfinished Business
| 
| align=center| 1
| align=center| 1:21
| Stockton, California, United States
| 
|-
| Win
| align=center| 3–0
| Chris Bostick
| TKO (punches)
| Global Knockout 4 
| 
| align=center| 1
| align=center| N/A
| Jackson, California, United States
| 
|-
| Win
| align=center| 2–0
| Pete Werve
| TKO (punches)
| Global Knockout 2
| 
| align=center| 2
| align=center| 2:52
| Jackson, California, United States
| 
|-
| Win
| align=center| 1–0
| Chris Garrison
| TKO (punches)
| Global Knockout 2
| 
| align=center| 1
| align=center| 0:32
| Jackson, California, United States
|

References

External links
 Carl Seumanutafa at PFL
 
 

1983 births
Living people
Samoan male mixed martial artists
American male mixed martial artists
Heavyweight mixed martial artists
Mixed martial artists utilizing wrestling
Mixed martial artists utilizing Brazilian jiu-jitsu
Samoan male sport wrestlers
American male sport wrestlers
Amateur wrestlers
Samoan practitioners of Brazilian jiu-jitsu
American practitioners of Brazilian jiu-jitsu